Lucero Gonzalo Álvarez Martínez (born 24 February 1985 in Montevideo, Uruguay) is an Uruguayan footballer playing as goalkeeper for Miramar Misiones.

Career
In the summer 2020, Álvarez moved to Miramar Misiones.

Teams
 Nacional 2005
 Vélez Sársfield 2006
 Nacional 2006-2007
 Juventud Las Piedras 2008
 Villa Española 2008-2009
 Rampla Juniors 2009-2012
 Sud América 2012
 Deportivo Pasto 2013
 Alebrijes de Oaxaca 2014-2017
 Lobos BUAP 2017-

References

External links
 
 
 Profile at Tenfield Digital 

1985 births
Living people
Uruguayan footballers
Uruguayan expatriate footballers
Club Atlético Vélez Sarsfield footballers
Club Nacional de Football players
Rampla Juniors players
Villa Española players
Juventud de Las Piedras players
Sud América players
Deportivo Pasto footballers
Alebrijes de Oaxaca players
Lobos BUAP footballers
Águilas Doradas Rionegro players
Atlético Venezuela C.F. players
Dorados de Sinaloa footballers
Miramar Misiones players
Argentine Primera División players
Venezuelan Primera División players
Uruguayan Primera División players
Categoría Primera A players
Liga MX players
Association football goalkeepers
Uruguayan expatriate sportspeople in Argentina
Uruguayan expatriate sportspeople in Colombia
Uruguayan expatriate sportspeople in Mexico
Uruguayan expatriate sportspeople in Venezuela
Expatriate footballers in Argentina
Expatriate footballers in Colombia
Expatriate footballers in Mexico
Expatriate footballers in Venezuela